The rabbit test, or Friedman test, was an early pregnancy test developed in 1931 by Maurice Friedman and Maxwell Edward Lapham at the University of Pennsylvania.

Test 
The hormone human chorionic gonadotropin (hCG) is produced during pregnancy and can be found in a pregnant woman's urine and blood; it indicates the presence of an implanted fertilized egg. An earlier test, known as the AZ test, was developed by Selmar Aschheim and Bernhard Zondek. When urine from a woman in the early months of pregnancy was injected into immature female mice, their ovaries would enlarge and show follicular maturation. The test was considered reliable, with an error rate of less than 2%. Friedman and Lapham's test was essentially identical, but replaced the mouse with a rabbit. A few days after the injection, the animal would be dissected and the size of her ovaries examined.

The rabbit test became a widely used bioassay (animal-based test) to test for pregnancy. The term "rabbit test" was first recorded in 1949, and was the origin of a common euphemism, "the rabbit died", for a positive pregnancy test. The phrase was, in fact, based on a common misconception about the test. While many people assumed that the injected rabbit would die only if the woman was pregnant, in fact all rabbits used for the test died, as they had to be dissected in order to examine the ovaries.

A later alternative to the rabbit test, known as the "Hogben test", used the African clawed frog, and yielded results without the need to cut the animal open. Modern pregnancy tests continue to operate on the basis of testing for the presence of the hormone hCG in the blood or urine, but no longer require the use of a live animal.

References

Sources

External links 
 
 The Rabbit Test at Snopes
 About dot Com Explanation at German Inventions and Discoveries
 The demand for pregnancy testing: The Aschheim–Zondek reaction, diagnostic versatility, and laboratory services in 1930s Britain, pages 240–241

Tests for pregnancy